The 2011 Alcorn State Braves football team represented Alcorn State University as a member of the East Division of the Southwestern Athletic Conference during then 2011 NCAA Division I FCS football season. Led by first-year head coach Melvin Spears, the Braves compiled an overall record of 2–8 with a mark of 1–8 in conference play, tying for fourth place in the SWAC's East Division. The team played their home games at Casem-Spinks Stadium in Lorman, Mississippi.

Schedule

References

Alcorn State
Alcorn State Braves football seasons
Alcorn State Braves football